This is a list of U.S. states and the District of Columbia by annual net migration. The first table lists U.S. states and the District of Columbia by annual net domestic migration, while the second table lists U.S. states and the District of Columbia by annual net international migration. There is a separate table for the U.S. territories. The term net domestic migration describes the total number of people moving to a state from another state minus people moving to another state from that state. The term net international migration describes the total number of people moving to a state from another country minus people moving to another country from that state.

Net domestic migration

Net international migration

U.S. territories

References 

Net Migration
Net Migration
Ranked lists of country subdivisions
United States demography-related lists